CBK-FM is a Canadian radio station, which broadcasts the programming of the CBC Music network at 96.9 FM in Regina, Saskatchewan.

The station was launched on May 1, 1977. Its studios are at the CBC Regina Broadcast Centre, 2440 Broad Street in Regina, along with CBK and CBKT-DT.

Rebroadcasters

References

External links
 
 

BK
BK
Radio stations established in 1977
1977 establishments in Saskatchewan